Lewis-Palmer High School (LPHS) is a public high school in Monument, Colorado. It is one of only two high schools in the Lewis-Palmer School District 38, the other being Palmer Ridge High School.

2006 Issue 
The school refused to give its 2006 valedictorian her diploma after she mentioned Jesus Christ in her commencement speech. Corder pursued legal action against the school district. The court ruled against Corder by declaring that the graduation was a school-sponsored event and therefore the school was under the obligation to uphold the constitutional separation between church and state. The court also ruled that the school's policy for graduation speeches was too vague, and thus unconstitutional due to the "chilling effect" that is created by overly broad rules.

Notable Teacher 
In 2015, Kathy Thirkell won the Colorado Teachers of the Year award.

Notable alumni

 Josh Scott (basketball), professional basketball player and former University of Colorado basketball star.
 Bobby Burling, professional MLS player, attended Lewis-Palmer High School
 Pat Garrity, basketball player who played ten years in the NBA
 Kim Lyons, personal trainer, appeared on The Biggest Loser
 Jennifer Sipes, actress and model, born in Monument, attended Lewis-Palmer High School
Derek Theler, actor and model, attended Lewis-Palmer High School

References

External links
 

Public high schools in Colorado
Schools in El Paso County, Colorado